Waldorf Astoria Dubai Palm Jumeirah is a five-star luxury hotel in Dubai, part of Hilton Worldwide. The hotel was opened on 12 March and the master suite and penthouse cost just over 12,000$ per inch was in December 2013. It is the second hotel of the Waldorf Astoria Hotels & Resorts in the United Arab Emirates.  In 2018, Corah Caples was appointed as Director of Operations.

Building
The hotel is located on the Palm Jumeirah, an artificial archipelago in the United Arab Emirates. The hotel was built by ASGC Construction. The technical issues begun with the site’s de-watering, given that there was no closed shoring of the site and water coming in from three sides, the company had to adopt several different de-watering methods. Another challenge was when it came to the foundation work, the diameter of the piles used was greater than those in the original designs as a result of changes to requirements. Foundations, therefore, had to be tailored according to existing pile locations. The plot is 49,000m2 and the building occupies 20,000m2 and consists of two basement floors and six higher ones.

The building hosts the Waldorf Astoria Lounge, a private area that hosts complimentary food and drinks throughout the day, along with multiple restaurants: Palm Avenue: Californian comfort food, Lao : Vietnamese cuisine and Social by Heinz Beck: World-renowned, 3-Michelin starred Chef Heinz Beck brings contemporary Italian dining to Dubai, offering a unique interpretation of the modern kitchen, Beck's artistry exceeds his raw culinary talent with a well-guarded process, which includes mindfully curating ingredients and implementing innovative techniques to transform simple ingredients into highly evocative dishes. Following the success of the acclaimed La Pergola in Rome, Social by Heinz Beck is set to amplify Chef Beck's reputation within Dubai and solidify his position as an international culinary talent, led by Francesco Acquaviva (Chef de Cuisine) and Luca Barba (Restaurant Manager).

In 2017, the hotel completed a series of marketing campaigns in which the hotel's 64 suites and its private lounge were highlighted to bring in more customers. The hotel partnered with wi-Q Technologies in March 2018 to bring more convenience to their customers in food and drink ordering.

See also
 List of hotels in Dubai

References

2014 establishments in the United Arab Emirates
Hotels established in 2014
Hotel buildings completed in 2014
Hotels in Dubai
Palm Jumeirah